Janet Key (10 July 1945 – 26 July 1992) was an English actress with a varied career in theatre, film and television from the late 1960s until her death.

Career
Key was born in Bath, Somerset, and trained at the nearby Bristol Old Vic Theatre School. Her stage career included stints with the National Theatre and the Royal Shakespeare Company, alongside touring and fringe productions. Between 1970 and 1975 Key appeared in four horror films, as well as the sex comedy Percy and the historical drama Lady Caroline Lamb. Her only other cinema appearance came later in Nineteen Eighty-Four, although she also featured in several made-for-TV dramas, including the role of Charmian in the Jonathan Miller production of Antony and Cleopatra for the ambitious BBC Television Shakespeare project. Key became a familiar face on British television through many guest appearances in a wide variety of popular series ranging from crime and espionage through to comedy.

Personal life
Key married actor Gawn Grainger in 1970. The couple had two children. Key died of cancer on 26 July 1992, aged 47. In 1994, Grainger married actress Zoë Wanamaker, who had been an acquaintance of Key's.

An obituary by Sebastian Graham-Jones in The Independent said: "Janet Key was an actress of particular versatility. She was a high-spirited beauty with an acerbic style and talent that were entirely her own."

Filmography
1970: The Vampire Lovers – Gretchin
1971: Percy – Hazel Anthony
1972: Dracula A.D. 1972 – Anna
1972: Lady Caroline Lamb – Miss Fairfax
1973: And Now the Screaming Starts! – Bridget
1975: I Don't Want to Be Born – Jill Fletcher
1984: Nineteen Eighty-Four – The Instructress

Television appearances
1967–1968: The Wednesday Play – Honeymoon wife / Rosalind
1968: The Tenant of Wildfell Hall – Millicent Hargrave
1969: Department S – Jean
1970: Paul Temple – Christi
1972: The Adventurer – Virginia
1972: Jason King – Elaine
1972: Man at the Top – Dr. Helen Reid
1973: New Scotland Yard – Jean Rossen
1973: Thriller – Lisa
1974: Napoleon and Love – Louise Compoint
1974: Special Branch – Carla
1974: Sutherland's Law – Julie McKenna
1975: State of Emergency – Jane Frederick
1975: The Sweeney – Kate Regan
1976: The Crezz – Brenda Pitman
1979: Shoestring – Val Colefax
1980: The Enigma Files – Pam Knowland
1980: Minder – Gloria Brompton
1981: BBC Television Shakespeare – Charmian
1983: No Problem! – Kay Angel
1986: Never the Twain – Charlotte
1986: Taggart – Joyce Meacher
1988: Worlds Beyond – Lady Lucinda
1990: Making News – Rowena Lyle

References

External links
 

1945 births
1992 deaths
20th-century English actresses
Actresses from Somerset
Alumni of Bristol Old Vic Theatre School
Deaths from cancer in England
English film actresses
English stage actresses
English television actresses
People from Bath, Somerset